Dato' Sri Penghulu Tawi Sli (12 June 1912 – 1987) was the second chief minister of Sarawak.

Personal life and education
Tawi Sli was born in Banting, Lingga, Sri Aman, Sarawak. He hailed from an Anglican family. He received his formal education at St. Thomas school in Kuching until Form 3.

Early career
After school, Tawi Sli worked as a teacher in a mission school while undergoing a three-year training programme to become a pastor. He served as a clerk with the government before he retired in 1961.

Early political career
In 1963, Tawi Sli was appointed as Penghulu and he started to become active in politics. He was the secretary of Sarawak National Party (SNAP) of the Simanggang branch. He later resigned from SNAP and joined Parti Pesaka Sarawak in 1966.

Appointment to chief minister

Tawi Sli was appointed as the chief minister of Sarawak by the then Governor of Sarawak, Abang Haji Openg, during the 1966 Sarawak constitutional crisis. He was the chief minister for 3 months (16 June 1966 to 7 September 1966) before Stephen Kalong Ningkan was reinstated by the High Court as the legitimate chief minister. However, Tawi Sli later sworn in as the chief minister for the second time on 23 September 1966 following the successful ouster of Ningkan from the chief minister post.

Honours
 :
 Member of the Most Exalted Order of the Star of Sarawak (ABS) (1964)
 Knight Commander of the Most Exalted Order of the Star of Sarawak (PNBS) – Dato' (1967)

Later life
He retired from politics in 1974 and later was involved in business until his death in 1987. His wife, Datin Sri Dorothy Inti, died in April 2015.

References

Malaysian Anglicans
1912 births
Iban people
1987 deaths
Chief Ministers of Sarawak
Sarawak state ministers
People from Sarawak
Members of the Sarawak State Legislative Assembly
Sarawak National Party politicians
Parti Pesaka Bumiputera Bersatu politicians
Knights Commander of the Most Exalted Order of the Star of Sarawak